"Boss" (stylized in all caps) is a song recorded by South Korean boy group NCT U, the first unit of NCT under the management of SM Entertainment, serving as the lead single of NCT's debut studio album NCT 2018 Empathy. Musically, "Boss" was described as a dynamic, electro-hip-hop track with paunchy, chanting chorus of the bass-heavy dance that ends with a heavy synth.

Music video 
The music video for "Boss" was the first of the two music videos that was filmed in Kyiv, Ukraine directed by South Korean director Oui Kim, the other being the coupling NCT U single "Baby Don't Stop". The filming locations were the Ukrainian house, the abandoned bus park Number 7, the National Library of Ukraine named after Vernadsky.

Accolades

Charts

References 

2018 songs
NCT (band) songs
SM Entertainment singles
Songs written by Yoo Young-jin